The Córdoba and Huatusco Railroad (Ferrocarril de Córdoba a Huatusco, FCCH) was a  narrow gauge railway connecting Huatusco with Córdoba. It was opened in 1902 and closed in 1953.

History 

The FCCH built in an effort to provide rail service to the Veracruz town of Huatusco from the Ferrocarril Mexicano (FCM) at Córdoba. Julio Limantour was an investment partner in the banking firm of Hugo Scherer Jr. and Company for many years. He was well known in Mexico City’s business circles and abroad. Along with engineer Juan Navarro and Carlos Moricard, Limantour joined in a society to build a railroad line in Veracruz. In 1900 Navarro had acquired the rights to a railroad concession granted in 1898 to build a railroad line to run from Córdoba to Huatusco.

The route across the flanks of Pico de Orizaba required expensive construction. The construction of the railroad as well as the transportation of passengers, products and supplies were affected by the weather, topography, and infectious diseases, which were more prevalent near the coast. Construction was also delayed by the need for specialized equipment, some of which had to be acquired from firms in the United States and overseas. Funds were unavailable to complete the final  to Huatusco, and the line was sold to the Ferrocarril Mexicano in 1909 after Limantour's death.

FCM purchased three new passenger coaches for their  narrow gauge line and transferred a Shay locomotive from their Zacatlán Branch for use as a helper from Tomatlán to Coscomatepec. The locomotives had been built as coal burners with wooden cabs and  boilers, but were later given steel cabs and converted to burn fuel oil. Mixed trains ran through 1951 with a  2-6-0 pulling the coaches, a 4-door boxcar as a baggage car, and a flatcar with cloth roof to shade 3rd class seating on a longitudinal bench.  Rails were removed in 1953, and Luisa was placed on display in Mexico City. The other two 2-6-0 locomotives were scrapped in 1954.

Locomotives

References 

 
 
 
 

Defunct railway companies of Mexico
2 ft gauge railways in Mexico
History of Veracruz
Transportation in Veracruz
Ferrocarriles Nacionales de México
Railway companies established in 1902
1953 disestablishments in Mexico
Railway lines opened in 1902
Railway companies disestablished in 1953
Buildings and structures in Córdoba, Veracruz
Mexican companies established in 1902